Protein UXT (Ubiquitously eXpressed Transcript protein) also known as androgen receptor trapped clone 27 (ART-27) protein is a protein that in humans is encoded by the UXT gene.

Function 

UXT interacts with the N-terminus of the androgen receptor and plays a role in facilitating receptor-induced transcriptional activation. It is also likely to be involved in tumorigenesis as it is abundantly expressed in tumor tissues. This gene is part of a gene cluster on chromosome Xp11.23. Alternative splicing results in 2 transcript variants encoding different isoforms.

Transcript variant 2 is 575 bp in length, and it codes for a polypeptide sequence that is 157 amino acids long (~ 18 kDa).  It has been shown to interact with two AR N-terminal activation domains that are both required for full transcriptional activation. In addition, it is largely localized to the nucleus and is highly expressed in human prostate epithelial cells as well as breast tissues. ART-27 likely serves to link AR to a larger transcription factor complex as evidenced by its association with a number of proteins including RNA pol II subunit 5, a pair of prefoldin β-subunits, and TATA-binding protein-interacting proteins. It also shows homology to prefoldins which are small molecular weight proteins that assemble into molecular chaperone complexes to affect protein folding.

ART-27 is shown to be subject to both cell type and developmental regulation in humans.  Its expression is associated with an abundance of differentiated prostate epithelial cells, and regulated expression in prostate cancer cells results in decreased cell proliferation.  Significantly, because decreased levels of ART-27 are consistently found in prostate cancer cells, it likely plays a role in promoting epithelial differentiation via suppression of proliferative pathways. More recent studies have more definitively identified ART-27 as a corepressor of AR. The fact that the increase in gene transcription exhibited upon ART-27 depletion requires the presence of AR implies that it specifically functions as a corepressor of this receptor.  Despite the lack of information regarding its mechanisms of suppression, ART-27 likely plays multiple roles that inhibit AR-mediated transcription.  In the absence of androgens, ART-27 may bind the AR N terminus and thereby prevent AR-dependent activation of genes involved in cell proliferation.  Other mechanisms may include recruitment of ART-27 to AREs or inhibition of histone methylation which otherwise allows for increased transcription of target genes.

Interactions
UXT has been shown to interact with Androgen receptor.

References

Further reading